The 1989 Mid Glamorgan County Council election was held in May 1989 and was the fifth full election to Mid Glamorgan County Council. It was preceded by the 1985 election and followed by the 1993 election.

There were extensive boundary changes at this election, following The County of Mid Glamorgan (Electoral Arrangements) Order 1988. The number of wards were increased to 74, each electing one councillor.

Overview
The Labour Party retained overall control winning 65 of the 74 seats.

* existing councillor, for the same ward
o existing councillor, though because of boundary changes not for the same ward

Ward Results

Aberaman North

Aberaman South

Abercynon

Aberdare East

Aberdare West

Aber Valley

Bargoed

Bedwas

Bedwellty

Bettws

Brackla

Caerau

Cascade

Cornelly

Cwm Garw

Cwm Ogwr

Cwmbach

Cyfarthfa

Cymmer

Darren Valley

Dowlais

Ferndale

Gurnos

Hirwaun

Laleston

Litchard

Llanbradach

Llanharan

Llantrisant Town

Llantwit Fardre

Machen

Maesteg East

Maesteg West

Merthyr Vale

Mountain Ash

Nelson

Newcastle

Newcastle Higher

Park

Pencoed

Penrhiwceiber

Pentre

References

1989
1989 Welsh local elections